James L. Miller Sr. (1897–1989) was an immigrant to the United States who immigrated at the age of 3 in 1901. He served in World War I and later worked as a reporter for the The Kansas City Star and Kansas City Times, in Kansas City, Missouri.

He purchased the Washington Missourian newspaper in 1937 and started the Missourian Publishing company, in Washington, Missouri.

James L. Miller Sr. was inducted into the Missouri Press Association's Hall of Fame in 1991 along with Joseph Pulitzer founder of the St. Louis Post-Dispatch, William Rockhill Nelson founder of the Kansas City Star, and Joseph Charless founder of The Missouri Gazette. He received the National Newspaper Association James O. Amos Award for distinguished service and leadership in 2003.

His family now resides in Missouri and still owns the Washington Missourian newspaper.

References

1897 births
1989 deaths
People from Kansas City, Missouri
American photojournalists
Immigrants to the United States
The Kansas City Star people
Kansas City Times people